99 Luftballons (German for "99 Balloons"), also known as International Album, is a compilation album by German pop band Nena, released on 8 April 1984. It was their first album released worldwide following the success of "99 Luftballons" and also the first with English lyrics. The album had moderate success in America.

Alternate versions
The most widely known cover of this album is identical to the one used for most versions of the single "99 Luftballons" or "99 Red Balloons". The album was also released as Nena or International Album; this version used the same cover, but with "99 Luftballons" removed, and sometimes with additional sticker at upper left that says "International Album incl. Club-Mix - 99 Red Balloons". In Japan the first release was the original German language version, which was followed in April by the international version, which featured the extended Club Mix version of "99 Red Balloons" and was retitled as 99 Luftballons: First America. This had an alternate cover which featured the band pictured on a white background, which photo in various releases is the same or similar to the one on the single "Rette mich".

Songs
The album is composed of tracks released on the band's two previous albums, Nena (1983) and ? (Fragezeichen) (1984), five of which are English-translated versions.  "99 Red Balloons" ("99 Luftballons"), "Just a Dream" ("Nur geträumt"), "Kino", "Leuchtturm" and "99 Luftballons" were taken from Nena (1983), while "? (Question Mark)" ("? (Fragezeichen)"), "Hangin' on You" ("Ich häng' an dir"), "Let Me Be Your Pirate" ("Lass mich dein Pirat sein"), "Das Land der Elefanten", "Rette mich" and "Unerkannt durch's Märchenland" were taken from ? (Fragezeichen) (1984).

The lead single, "99 Luftballons", is the band's or even Nena's most successful song to date.  It reached number one in several countries worldwide, but is considered a one-hit wonder as other singles and albums performed poorly outside of Europe.  "Just a Dream" reached number 70 on the UK Singles Chart.  "Kino" was initially released on the album in German, but was translated into English titled as "Kino (At the Movies)".  Like its predecessor, "? (Question Mark)", the single failed to chart.  The song was later included as a bonus track on a re-release of the band's second English album It's All in the Game (1985).

Track listing 
Side A contains tracks 1 to 5 and side B contains tracks 6 to 11.
Notes
 UK, European and Israeli releases, titled simply "Nena", replaced the single version of "99 Red Balloons" with the extended "Club Mix" (running 4:43 in length). North and South American, Asian and Australasian releases, titled "99 Luftballons", featured the original single version.
 CD versions of the album also replace the single version of "99 Red Balloons" (Track 1) with the Club Mix (length 4:44). This change has been noted on some international pressings, but not on others. The correct version is available on the iTunes Store.
 Some releases erroneously printed "Das Land der Elefanten" as "Das Lang der Elefanten" and "Unerkannt durch's Märchenland" as "Unerkannt durch's Marchenland".
 The spelling of "durch's" instead of "durchs" in title that should be "Unerkannt  Märchenland" is an obvious error, too.
 The track list of the Spanish version is translated into Spanish.
 The track list of the Japanese version is partially written in katakana.

Personnel
Credits adapted from Allmusic and Discogs.

Nena
Nena Kerner – main vocals, arrangement
Jörn-Uwe Fahrenkrog-Petersen – main vocals (on "Das Land der Elefanten"), backing vocals (on "? (Question Mark)" and "Kino"), keyboards
Carlo Karges – guitar, backing vocals (on "Kino")
Jürgen Dehmel – bass
Rolf Brendel – drums, percussion

Technical personnel
David Sanborn – saxophone (on "? (Question Mark)")
Manfred "Manne" Praeker – production
Reinhold Heil – production
After Hours Studio – cover design
Jim Rakete – photography

Charts

Certifications

Release history

References

External links
 International Album / 99 Luftballons at the official Nena website
 

1984 compilation albums
Nena (band) albums
Albums produced by Reinhold Heil
Epic Records compilation albums
German-language albums